Murici is a municipality located in the east of the Brazilian state of Alagoas. Its population is 28,333 (2020) and its area is 424 km². According to the Veja magazine, despite receiving generous public transfers, the city still lags behind most municipalities in Brazil in human development. 30.6% of its inhabitants are illiterate and 65% rely on Federal funds to survive, which contribute for an HDI of just 0.58, slightly below Iraq's HDI of 0.59.

The municipality contains 61% of the  Murici Ecological Station, created in 2001.

References

Municipalities in Alagoas